Tyler Shelvin (born July 22, 1998) is an American football nose tackle for the Tennessee Titans of the National Football League (NFL). He played college football at LSU.

High school career
Shelvin started his high school career at Northside High School in Lafayette, Louisiana, playing kicker, punter and defensive lineman in addition to playing on the basketball team. At Northside, Shelvin participated in the Under Armour Future 50 in early 2016. After academic issues led to a transfer to Notre Dame High School in Crowley, Louisiana, Shelvin was the number one recruit in the state of Louisiana and a four-star prospect according to 247Sports.com. He committed to Louisiana State on March 11, 2015, choosing the Tigers over offers from Alabama and Nebraska. After committing, however, Shelvin visited the Alabama campus and also received interest from Mississippi State and Texas A&M. Shelvin participated in the Under Armour All-America Game after his senior season.

College career
Due to NCAA rules, Shelvin was an academic redshirt during his true freshman season. Sitting at third-string on the depth chart at nose tackle during his redshirt freshman season, Shelvin was suspended for two weeks by the team for discipline issues. He cracked the starting lineup during his sophomore season. He won a national championship with LSU during his 2019 sophomore season. On January 15, 2020, Shelvin announced his intention to stay in college for his junior season.

Professional career

Cincinnati Bengals
Shelvin was drafted by the Cincinnati Bengals in the fourth round, 122nd overall, of the 2021 NFL Draft. He signed his four-year rookie contract with Cincinnati on May 17.

Playing sparingly, Shelvin played in 3 regular season games as a rookie, recording 4 tackles in a week 18 loss to the Cleveland Browns. After being declared inactive during the Bengals' Wild Card win against the Las Vegas Raiders, Shelvin would play in the Bengals' playoff wins against the Tennessee Titans and Kansas City Chiefs respectively, however Shelvin recorded no stats in either playoff game. Shelvin did not play in the Bengals' 23-20 loss in Super Bowl LVI.

On August 30, 2022, Shelvin was waived by the Bengals and signed to the practice squad the next day. He was released on December 6.

Tennessee Titans
On January 23, 2023, Shelvin signed a reserve/future contract with the Tennessee Titans.

References

External links
LSU Tigers bio

1998 births
Living people
African-American players of American football
Players of American football from Louisiana
Sportspeople from Lafayette, Louisiana
American football defensive tackles
LSU Tigers football players
Cincinnati Bengals players
21st-century African-American sportspeople
Tennessee Titans players